Talbot Pendleton was an American football player. He attended Princeton University, where he played football, baseball, and ran track. In 1910, he was named a consensus All-American by Collier's Weekly, Leslie's Weekly, and sportswriter W.S. Farnsworth.

References

Year of birth missing
Year of death missing
All-American college football players
American football guards
American football halfbacks
Princeton Tigers football players